Kam Man Food (abbreviated KM Food) is a Chinese supermarket chain with its corporate headquarters in Edison, New Jersey.

Its original location is in Chinatown, New York City.  While it has its main store in Manhattan (named "New Kam Man"), it also has locations in Quincy, Massachusetts, Edison, New Jersey and East Hanover, New Jersey. A location in Staten Island, New York, opened in 2005 and closed on October 1, 2006.

The first Chinese supermarket on the East Coast of the United States, Kam Man opened for business in 1972.  Its main store is located at 200 Canal Street, between Mott Street and Mulberry Street, and carries such Asian mainstays as meats and produce, noodles, sauces, frozen foods, ginseng and various herbs. It also has an entire floor dedicated to cooking utensils, Asian ceramics and loose teas.

Its store in Edison, New Jersey, anchors a plaza that also includes a video rental shop, pharmacy, cell phone shop, travel agency, and a branch of the World Journal Bookstore.

Kam Man's expansion into Quincy, Massachusetts, has been the subject of several articles on the growth of New England's Asian American community. Opened in 2003, the Quincy store anchors a mall that includes 40 shops. Kam Man and other Asian-owned businesses are seen as filling a market space catering to affluent suburban Asian Americans unwilling to drive to traditional urban Chinatowns to shop. As of August 2007, the Quincy store was the largest Asian supermarket in New England.

See also
 Chinese Americans in New York City

References

External links
Kam Man Marketplace - Official website
New Kam Man - Official website

Asian-American culture in Massachusetts
Asian-American culture in New Jersey
American companies established in 1972
Retail companies established in 1972
Chinese-American culture in New York City
Chinese supermarkets
Companies based in Middlesex County, New Jersey
Edison, New Jersey